Below is a partial list of Minor League Baseball players in the Toronto Blue Jays and rosters of their minor league affiliates.

Players

Addison Barger

Addison Barger (born November 12, 1999) is an American professional baseball infielder in the Toronto Blue Jays organization. He is ranked 14th on Major League Baseball's 2022 Top 30 Blue Jays prospects list.

Barger attended C. Leon King High School in Tampa, Florida. He was drafted by the Toronto Blue Jays in the sixth round of the 2018 Major League Baseball draft. He made his professional debut that season with the Gulf Coast Blue Jays and played 2019 with the Bluefield Blue Jays.

Barger did not play for a team in 2020 due to the Minor League Baseball season being cancelled because of the Covid-19 pandemic. He returned in 2021 to play for the Dunedin Blue Jays and Vancouver Canadians. He started 2022 with Vancouver before being promoted to the New Hampshire Fisher Cats. He was added to the 40-man roster following the 2022 season.

Manuel Beltre

Manuel Beltre (born June 9, 2004) is a Dominican professional baseball shortstop in the Toronto Blue Jays organization. He is ranked 22nd on Major League Baseball's 2022 Top 30 Blue Jays prospects list.

Beltre signed with the Blue Jays in July 2020 as an international free agent, and received a $2.35 million signing bonus. He was assigned to the Dominican Summer League Blue Jays for the 2021 minor league season. In 53 games, Beltre batted .225 with two home runs, 29 runs batted in (RBI), and 10 stolen bases. Beltre also walked more than he struck out, with 42 and 33 respectively.

Irv Carter

Irving Roosevelt Carter (born October 9, 2002) is an American professional baseball pitcher in the Toronto Blue Jays organization. He is ranked 23rd on Major League Baseball's 2022 Top 30 Blue Jays prospects list.

Carter attended Calvary Christian Academy in Fort Lauderdale, Florida. He was drafted by the Toronto Blue Jays in the fifth round of the 2021 Major League Baseball Draft. In 2022, he was assigned to the Florida Complex League Blue Jays before being promoted to the Dunedin Blue Jays.

Chad Dallas

John Chadwell Dallas (born June 26, 2000) is an American professional baseball pitcher in the Toronto Blue Jays organization. He is ranked 28th on Major League Baseball's 2022 Top 30 Blue Jays prospects list.

Dallas attended West Orange-Stark High School. In his senior season, Dallas was named Orange County's Most Valuable Player, allowing only four earned runs during the season and  batting .410. Undrafted out of high school, he attended Panola College for one year, where he pitched to a 5–0 win–loss record with a 1.15 earned run average (ERA) and 71 strikeouts in 39 innings pitched. Following the season, Dallas transferred to the University of Tennessee. In his first season with the Volunteers, Dallas went 3–0 with a 2.53 ERA and 21 strikeouts before the season ended prematurely due to the COVID-19 pandemic. In his second and final season in Tennessee, Dallas posted an 11–2 record with a 4.19 ERA and a team-leading 122 strikeouts in 103 innings.

Dallas was selected by the Toronto Blue Jays in the fourth round of the 2021 Major League Baseball draft. In 2022, he was assigned to the High-A Vancouver Canadians of the Northwest League, and debuted with five no-hit innings.

Adrián Hernández

Adrián Ulises Hernández (born January 22, 2000) is a Mexican professional baseball pitcher in the Toronto Blue Jays organization. He is ranked 24th on Major League Baseball's 2022 Top 30 Blue Jays prospects list.

Hernandez signed with the Blue Jays as an international free agent on November 23, 2017, and in 2018 was assigned to the Rookie-level Dominican Summer League Blue Jays. In 55 innings pitched, Hernandez posted a 3–1 win–loss record, 2.60 earned run average (ERA), and 64 strikeouts. In 2019, Hernandez pitched for the Gulf Coast League Blue Jays, and struggled to an 8.02 ERA in 16 relief appearances. He did not play in 2020, due to the minor league season being cancelled because of the COVID-19 pandemic, but during the 2020–21 winter season Hernandez played for the Cañeros de Los Mochis of the Mexican Pacific League. In 20 appearances, he pitched to a 1–0 record, 2.45 ERA, and 34 strikeouts.

Hernandez began the 2021 season with the Class-A Dunedin Blue Jays, and was later promoted to the High-A Vancouver Canadians and Double-A New Hampshire Fisher Cats. In a combined 62 innings, Hernandez went 3–2 with a 2.74 ERA, 108 strikeouts, and seven saves, and was named a Minor League Baseball (MiLB) Organization All-Star following the season. He began the 2022 season with New Hampshire, and was promoted to the Triple-A Buffalo Bisons early in the year.

Miguel Hiraldo

Miguel Angel Hiraldo (born September 5, 2000) is a Dominican professional baseball shortstop and third baseman in the Toronto Blue Jays organization.

Hiraldo signed with the Blue Jays as an international free agent on July 2, 2017, for a $750,000 signing bonus. He began the 2018 season assigned to the Rookie-level Dominican Summer League Blue Jays, and earned a late-season promotion to the Gulf Coast League Blue Jays. In 64 total games, Hiraldo batted .300 with two home runs, 36 runs batted in (RBI), and 18 stolen bases. Hiraldo played the 2019 season mostly with the Rookie Advanced Bluefield Blue Jays, appearing in one game for the Class-A Lansing Lugnuts at the end of the season. In total, he played 57 games and hit .299 with seven home runs, 37 runs batted in, and 11 stolen bases. The 2020 minor league season was cancelled due to the COVID-19 pandemic, and Hiraldo did not play baseball at any level. In 2021, Hiraldo played 105 games for the Dunedin Blue Jays, and batted .249 with seven home runs, 52 RBI, and 29 stolen bases.

Leo Jimenez 

Leonardo Jimenez (born May 17, 2001) is a Panamanian professional baseball shortstop and second baseman in the Toronto Blue Jays organization. He is ranked 17th on Major League Baseball's 2022 Top 30 Blue Jays prospects list.

Jimenez signed with the Blue Jays as an international free agent on July 2, 2017, receiving a $800,000 signing bonus. He began his minor league career in 2018 with the Rookie-level Gulf Coast League Blue Jays, hitting .250 in 37 games. He spent 2019 almost exclusively with the Rookie Advanced Bluefield Blue Jays, hitting .298 in 56 games.

He did not play in 2020, due to the cancelled Minor League season. In 2021, he spent most of the year with the Single-A Dunedin Blue Jays, playing in 54 games and batting .316. 

On November 19, 2021, Toronto added Jimenez to the 40-man roster to protect him from the Rule 5 draft.

In 2022, he started the season with the High-A Vancouver Canadians. Jimenez was optioned to the Double-A New Hampshire Fisher Cats to begin the 2023 season.

Hayden Juenger

Hayden Michael Juenger (born August 9, 2000) is an American professional baseball pitcher in the Toronto Blue Jays organization. He is ranked 7th on Major League Baseball's 2022 Top 30 Blue Jays prospects list.

Juenger attended O'Fallon Township High School in O'Fallon, Illinois and played college baseball at Missouri State University. He was drafted by the Toronto Blue Jays in the sixth round of the 2021 Major League Baseball draft.

Juenger made his professional debut with the Vancouver Canadians. In 11 games, he had a 2–0 win–loss record, 2.70 earned run average (ERA), and 34 strikeouts over 20 innings pitched.

Adam Kloffenstein

Adam Kloffenstein (born August 25, 2000) is an American professional baseball pitcher in the Toronto Blue Jays organization.

Kloffenstein attended Magnolia High School in Magnolia, Texas. He was selected in the third round of the 2018 Major League Baseball draft by the Toronto Blue Jays, and signed on June 12 for a $2.45 million signing bonus. Kloffenstein was assigned to the Rookie-level Gulf Coast League Blue Jays with former Magnolia teammate Jordan Groshans. He made his professional debut on August 20 and pitched one scoreless inning. In total for his 2018 season, Kloffenstein pitched two scoreless innings. In 2019, he was promoted to the Short Season-A Vancouver Canadians where he started 13 games, going 4-4 and recording a 2.24 ERA.

Cullen Large

Cullen Large (born January 22, 1996) is an American baseball outfielder, second baseman and third baseman in the Toronto Blue Jays organization.

Large played college baseball at William & Mary for three seasons. He was named second team All-Colonial Athletic Association (CAA) after hitting .328 with seven home runs in his sophomore season. As a junior, Large batted .338 with 24 extra-base hits and 39 RBIs with 45 runs scored and was named first team All-CAA.

Large was selected in the 5th round of the 2017 Major League Baseball draft by the Toronto Blue Jays. After signing with the team he was assigned to the Vancouver Canadians of the Class A Short Season Northwest League, where he mostly played second base. Large spent the 2018 season with the Class A Lansing Lugnuts of the Midwest League, where he batted .316 through 27 games before suffering a season-ending shoulder injury. He was assigned to the Dunedin Blue Jays of the Florida State League to start the 2019 season and moved to third base before being promoted to the Double-A New Hampshire Fisher Cats. Large was named to the Blue Jays' 2021 Spring Training roster as a non-roster invitee.

William & Mary Tribe bio

Adam Macko

Adam Macko (born December 30, 2000) is a Slovakian professional baseball pitcher in the Toronto Blue Jays organization. He is ranked 8th on Major League Baseball's 2022 Top 30 Blue Jays prospects list.

Macko was born in Bratislava, Slovakia and moved to Alberta, Canada when he was 12. He attended Vauxhall High School in Vauxhall, Alberta. The Seattle Mariners selected him in the seventh round of the 2019 Major League Baseball Draft.

Macko made his professional debut with the Arizona League Mariners and played in one game for the Everett AquaSox. He did not play for a team in 2020 due to there being no Minor League Baseball season because of the Covid-19 Pandemic. He returned in 2021 to pitch for the Modesto Nuts and started 2022 with Everett.

On November 16, 2022, Macko and Erik Swanson were traded to the Toronto Blue Jays for Teoscar Hernández.

Orelvis Martínez

Orelvis Miguel Martínez (born November 19, 2001) is a Dominican professional baseball shortstop / third baseman in the Toronto Blue Jays organization. He is ranked second on Major League Baseball's 2022 Top 30 Blue Jays prospects list, and 70th overall on the 2022 Top 100 MLB prospects list.

Martínez signed with the Blue Jays organization as an international free agent on July 2, 2018. His $3.5 million signing bonus is the second-highest signing bonus given to an international free agent in team history, just behind the $3.9 million bonus given to Vladimir Guerrero Jr. in 2015. Martínez was assigned to the Rookie-level Gulf Coast League Blue Jays for the 2019 season. He appeared in 40 games and recorded a .275 batting average, seven home runs, and 32 runs batted in (RBI). 

Martínez was added to the 40-man roster following the 2022 season. Martínez was optioned to the Triple-A Buffalo Bisons to begin the 2023 season.

Tanner Morris

Tanner Morris (born September 13, 1997) is an American professional baseball infielder in the Toronto Blue Jays organization. He is ranked 19th on Major League Baseball's 2022 Top 30 Blue Jays prospects list.

Morris attended The Miller School of Albemarle in Charlottesville, Virginia and played college baseball at University of Virginia. In two season with the Cavaliers, Morris batted .323 with seven home runs and 58 runs batted in (RBI). During the 2018 offseason, he played collegiate summer baseball for the Harwich Mariners of the Cape Cod Baseball League and was named a league all-star.

Morris was selected by the Toronto Blue Jays in the fifth round of the 2019 Major League Baseball draft. He made his professional debut with the Short Season-A Vancouver Canadians, appearing in 64 games and hitting .246 with two home runs and 28 RBI. He did not play for a team in 2020 due to the COVID-19 pandemic's cancellation of the minor league season. He returned to Vancouver in 2021, recording a .285 batting average, seven home runs, and 57 RBI in 103 games. Morris started 2022 with the Double-A New Hampshire Fisher Cats before being promoted to the Triple-A Buffalo Bisons in June.

Joey Murray

Joseph Murray (born September 23, 1996) is an American professional baseball pitcher in the Toronto Blue Jays organization.

Murray attended Dublin Coffman High School in his hometown of Dublin, Ohio. Undrafted out of high school, he then attended Kent State University, playing three seasons for the Golden Flashes. In his freshman season, Murray pitched to a 2–1 win–loss record, 3.69 earned run average (ERA), and 57 strikeouts in 39 innings pitched. In the summer, Murray played for the Keene Swamp Bats of the New England Collegiate Baseball League. As a sophomore in 2017, he went 6–1 with a 1.80 ERA and 110 strikeouts in 75 innings, and in the summer played for the Cape Cod League's Orleans Firebirds, where he was named a league all-star. In his third and final season with the Golden Flashes, Murray posted a 9–2 record with a 2.45 ERA and 141 strikeouts in 95 innings. He was named the Mid-American Conference Baseball Pitcher of the Year in both 2017 and 2018.

Murray was selected in the eighth round of the 2018 Major League Baseball draft by the Toronto Blue Jays. He signed for the full draft-slot bonus of $169,600 and was assigned to the Short Season-A Vancouver Canadians. In 25 innings, Murray went 1–1 with a 1.75 ERA and 39 strikeouts. Murray began the 2019 season with the Class-A Lansing Lugnuts, and later earned promotions to the Advanced-A Dunedin Blue Jays and Double-A New Hampshire Fisher Cats. He posted a combined 10–7 record with a 2.75 ERA. His 169 strikeouts led the entire Blue Jays organization.

Trent Palmer

Trent Michael Palmer (born April 2, 1999) is an American professional baseball pitcher in the Toronto Blue Jays organization. He is ranked 25th on Major League Baseball's 2022 Top 30 Blue Jays prospects list.

Palmer attended Anoka High School in Anoka, Minnesota and played college baseball at Jacksonville University. In 2019, he played collegiate summer baseball with the Wareham Gatemen of the Cape Cod Baseball League and was named a league all-star. In three seasons with the Dolphins, Palmer posted a 10–6 win–loss record, 3.52 earned run average (ERA), and 157 strikeouts in 133 innings pitched. He was drafted by the Toronto Blue Jays in the third round of the 2020 Major League Baseball draft.

Palmer made his professional debut with the Single-A Dunedin Blue Jays in 2021. During the season, he threw two seven-inning no-hitters. Palmer finished the 2021 season with a 4–2 record, 3.00 ERA, and 83 strikeouts in 63 innings. He started 2022 with the High-A Vancouver Canadians before being promoted to the Double-A New Hampshire Fisher Cats. In August, he underwent Tommy John Surgery.

Eric Pardinho

Eric Eiji Pardinho (born January 5, 2001) is a Brazilian professional baseball pitcher in the Toronto Blue Jays organization.

As a 15-year-old, Pardinho played for Brazil in their attempt to qualify for the 2017 World Baseball Classic. He was ranked by MLB as the fifth-best international prospect available during the 2017 international signing period. On July 2, 2017, Pardinho signed with the Toronto Blue Jays and received a $1.4 million signing bonus. He was assigned to extended spring training for the remainder of the year, as well as the first half of the 2018 season. On June 20, 2018, Pardinho made his professional debut with the Rookie Advanced Bluefield Blue Jays.

On February 11, 2020, Pardinho underwent Tommy John surgery and was ruled-out for the entire 2020 season.

Sem Robberse

Sem Robberse (born October 12, 2001) is a Dutch professional baseball pitcher in the Toronto Blue Jays organization. He is ranked 6th on Major League Baseball's 2022 Top 30 Blue Jays prospects list.

Robberse was born in Zeist, Netherlands. In 2018 he played for Honkbalclub Allen Weerbaar of the Honkbal Hoofdklasse (Dutch Major League), and posted a 1–3 win–loss record, 1.80 earned run average (ERA), and 12 strikeouts in 20 innings pitched. The following season he played for Amsterdamsche Honkbal Club Quick, and in nine starts totalling 64 innings pitched Robberse went 6–3 with a 1.83 ERA and 62 strikeouts. At an international tournament in Barcelona, Robberse was approached by scouts from several teams, including the Toronto Blue Jays and Kansas City Royals. He ultimately signed with the Blue Jays and was assigned to the Rookie-level Gulf Coast League Blue Jays. Robberse made five appearances for the Blue Jays in 2019, and went 2–0 with a 0.87 ERA and nine strikeouts in 10 innings.

The 2020 minor league season was cancelled due to the COVID-19 pandemic. Due to travel restrictions Robberse was unable to return home to the Netherlands, and instead remained in Clearwater, Florida. Robberse began the 2021 season with the Low-A Dunedin Blue Jays, and was later promoted to the High-A Vancouver Canadians. In a combined 88 innings, he posted a 5–7 record with a 4.36 ERA and 90 strikeouts.

Yosver Zulueta

Yosver José Zulueta (born January 23, 1998) is a Cuban professional baseball pitcher in the Toronto Blue Jays organization. He is ranked 5th on Major League Baseball's 2022 Top 30 Blue Jays prospects list.

Zulueta signed with the Toronto Blue Jays as an international free agent in 2019. He spent 2020 recovering from Tommy John surgery, though the season was cancelled due to the COVID-19 pandemic.

Zulueta made his professional debut in 2021 with the Low-A Dunedin Blue Jays but pitched in only one game due to a torn ACL. He returned from the injury to start 2022 with Dunedin before being promoted to the High-A Vancouver Canadians, and later played with the Double-A New Hampshire Fisher Cats and Triple-A Buffalo Bisons. In 21 total appearances, Zulueta pitched to a 2–5 win–loss record, 3.72 earned run average (ERA), and 84 strikeouts in 55 innings pitched. 

Zulueta was added to the 40-man roster after the 2022 season. Zulueta was optioned to Triple-A Buffalo to begin the 2023 season.

Full Triple-A to Rookie League rosters

Triple-A

Double-A

High-A

Single-A

Rookie

References

Minor league players
Lists of minor league baseball players